Schmitten is a municipality in the Albula Region in the canton of Graubünden in Switzerland.

History
Schmitten is first mentioned in 1447 as Schmiten.

Geography

Of this area, 25.1% is used for agricultural purposes, while 57.1% is forested. Of the rest of the land, 1.7% is settled (buildings or roads) and the remainder (16.2%) is non-productive (rivers, glaciers or mountains).

Before 2017, the municipality was located in the Belfort sub-district of the Albula District, after 2017 it was part of the Albula Region.

Demographics

, 10.5% of the population was made up of foreign nationals. Over the last 10 years the population has grown at a rate of 1.6%.
 
, the gender distribution of the population was 50.7% male and 49.3% female.  The age distribution, in Schmitten is; 66 people or 10.6% of the population are between 0 and 9 years old.  46 people or 7.4% are 10 to 14, and 46 people or 7.4% are 15 to 19.  Of the adult population, 74 people or 11.9% of the population are between 20 and 29 years old.  119 people or 19.2% are 30 to 39, 82 people or 13.2% are 40 to 49, and 73 people or 11.8% are 50 to 59.  The senior population distribution is 43 people or 6.9% of the population are between 60 and 69 years old, 47 people or 7.6% are 70 to 79, there are 21 people or 3.4% who are 80 to 89, and there are 3 people or 0.5% who are 90 to 99.

In the 2007 federal election the most popular party was the SVP which received 41.1% of the vote.  The next three most popular parties were the CVP (33.8%), the FDP (16.6%) and the SPS (7.6%).

In Schmitten about 75.9% of the population (between age 25-64) have completed either non-mandatory upper secondary education or additional higher education (either university or a Fachhochschule).

Schmitten has an unemployment rate of 0.63%.  , there were 4 people employed in the primary economic sector and about 2 businesses involved in this sector.  42 people are employed in the secondary sector and there are 3 businesses in this sector.  25 people are employed in the tertiary sector, with 4 businesses in this sector.

The historical population is given in the following table:

Heritage sites of national significance

The Schmittentobel and Landwasser Viaducts of the Rhaetian Railway are listed as Swiss heritage sites of national significance.

Languages
In the 14th and 15th centuries, the area was settled from Davos. Therefore, the municipality is traditionally German-speaking. Despite the neighboring Romansh-speaking villages, the percentage of Romansch speakers in Schmitten has always been well under 10%. , most of the population speaks German (94.2%), with Portuguese being second most common ( 2.1%) and Romansh being third ( 1.2%).

References

 
Municipalities of Graubünden
Cultural property of national significance in Graubünden